Island Falls may refer to: 

Island Falls, Maine, a town in the United States
Island Falls (CDP), Maine, the main village in the town
Island Falls, Saskatchewan, a power station in Canada